Eyalet of Rûm (originally Arabic for Eastern Roman Empire), later named as the Eyalet of Sivas, was an Ottoman eyalet in northern Anatolia, founded following Bayezid I's conquest of the area in the 1390s. The capital was the city of Amasya, which was then moved to Tokat and later to Sivas.

Rûm was the old Seljuk Turkish designation for Anatolia, referring to the Eastern Roman Empire and in European texts as late as the 19th-century the word Rûm (or Roum) was used to denote the whole of central Anatolia, not just the smaller area comprising the Ottoman province (see Sultanate of Rum).

History
In the 14th century several autonomous towns (Amasya, Tokat, Sivas) were established, despite the continued Seljukid-Mongol rule in central Asia Minor.

When the Ilkhanid ruler Ebu Said died in 1335, administration of Asia Minor was entrusted to his former governor Eretna Bey, a Uyghur. Eretna Bey ultimately declared independence, seeking the protection of the Mamluks, who were rivals of the Ilkhanids. He captured the area around Sivas-Kayseri, eventually establishing an emirate of Eretna, which grew stronger during the rule of his son, Mehmed Bey.

In 1381 Kadı Burhaneddin a kadı in Kayseri who was also appointed vizier to represent the emirate of Eretna in that town, replaced the Eretnid as ruler of Sivas and also captured Amasya and Tokat. His principality managed to resist interference in central Anatolia from both the Akkoyunlus and the Ottomans until it collapsed with his death in 1398.

Administrative divisions
The eyalet of Sivas consisted of seven sanjaks between 1700 and 1740:
 Sanjak of Sivas (Paşa Sancağı, Sivas)
 Sanjak of Amasya (Amasya)
 Sanjak of Janik (Canik Sancağı, Samsun)
 Sanjak of Diwriji (Divriği Sancağı, Divriği)
 Sanjak of Arabgir (Arabgir Sancağı, Arapgir)
 Sanjak of Chorum (Çorum Sancağı, Çorum)
 Sanjak of Bozok (Bozok Sancağı, Yozgat)

References

Eyalets of the Ottoman Empire in Anatolia
States and territories established in the 1390s
History of Amasya Province
History of Çorum Province
History of Kırıkkale Province
History of Malatya Province
History of Samsun Province
History of Ordu Province
History of Sivas Province
History of Tokat Province
History of Yozgat Province
1398 establishments in the Ottoman Empire
1864 disestablishments in the Ottoman Empire